Sulejman Tihić (26 November 1951 – 25 September 2014) was a Bosnian politician who served as the 4th Bosniak member of the Presidency of Bosnia and Herzegovina from 2002 to 2006. He was a member and later president of the Party of Democratic Action (SDA). From 2007 until his death in 2014, Tihić served as member of the national House of Peoples.

Born in Bosanski Šamac, he graduated from the Faculty of Law at the University of Sarajevo in 1975. Following his graduation, Tihić worked as a judge, prosecutor and a lawyer. During the Bosnian War of 1992–95, he was captured by Serb soldiers and was tortured in concentration camps in both Bosnia and Serbia. Following the war, Tihić entered into politics. Already being a founding member of the SDA, he was named its president in 2001. At the 2002 general election, Tihić was elected Bosniak member of the Bosnian Presidency, serving as its member until 2006. Following his time in the Presidency, Tihić was appointed as member of the national House of Peoples in 2007. As president of the SDA, he took part in many constitutional reform talks, most notably in those regarding the Prud Agreement between 2008 and 2009.

After years of health issues, including cancer, Tihić died on 25 September 2014 in Sarajevo, at the age of 62. He was buried in his hometown of Bosanski Šamac two days later.

Early life
Tihić was born in the town of Bosanski Šamac in northern Bosnia. He obtained a degree from the Sarajevo Law School in 1975. Tihić returned to Bosanski Šamac where he worked as a judge, prosecutor and a lawyer.

Bosnian War
When the Bosnian War started in April 1992, Tihić was captured by Serb soldiers and was tortured in three concentration camps in Bosnia, in Bosanski Šamac, Brčko and the Batković camp in Bijeljina, before being taken by helicopter to the Batajnica neighborhood of Belgrade in Serbia. He was also later tortured in a prison in Sremska Mitrovica.

Political career

In 1990, Tihić was one of the founding members of the Party of Democratic Action (SDA). On 13 October 2001, Tihić was chosen to succeed Alija Izetbegović as president of the party. At the 2002 general election, he was elected to the Presidency of Bosnia and Herzegovina. At the 2006 general election, Tihić decided to run for a second term in the Presidency, but failed to do so when election day came, winning only 27.5% of the votes, 35.3% less than elected Haris Silajdžić.

After the presidency, he would later go on to be a member of the House of Peoples of the Parliamentary Assembly of Bosnia and Herzegovina from 14 April 2007 until his death on 25 September 2014. During that period, Tihić was also Chairman of the House of Peoples a few times. American human rights lawyer Francis Boyle stated in his correspondence to the public that Tihić and Sakib Softić had ordered the restitution request from his original lawsuit in the Bosnian genocide case to be voided, thereby returning a favor to his coalition partners Alliance of Independent Social Democrats (SNSD) in Republika Srpska.

Prud Agreement

Together with the leaders of the three most important 'nationalist' political parties in Bosnia and Herzegovina, who acted as representatives of the constituent peoples, Milorad Dodik of the SNSD and Dragan Čović of the Croatian Democratic Union of Bosnia and Herzegovina (HDZ BiH), Tihić created the Prud Agreement or Prud Process, an agreement that pertained to state property, census, constitutional changes, reconstructing the Council of Ministers of Bosnia and Herzegovina and solving the legal status of Brčko District. The agreement was created in the village of Prud on 8 November 2008. The reforms promised by the agreement would "build the ability of the State to meet the requirements of the EU integration process".

At a subsequent meeting in Banja Luka on 26 January 2009, the party leaders set out a plan for Bosnia and Herzegovina as a decentralized country with three levels of government. The middle level of government was anticipated to be made up by four territorial units with legislative, executive and judicial branches of government.

Controversy surrounded the creation of a third entity, Republika Srpska’s territorial integrity, and the division of Bosnia and Herzegovina.

A further meeting was held in Mostar on 23 February 2009, hosted by Čović.

On 20 July 2009, the High Representative for Bosnia and Herzegovina, Valentin Inzko suggested that the process between the three 'nationalist' parties had effectively ended. Instead it had changed into a process involving many more political parties. Inzko believed that minor level constitutional reform can be delivered through the meetings.

Illness and death
Tihić had a tumor on his colon removed in January 2008 in Ljubljana, Slovenia. On 30 September 2013 it was announced that Tihić had been diagnosed with cancer. He was treated surgically in Germany on 4 October 2013; doctors expressed satisfaction with his recovery. On 22 August 2014, he was hospitalized at the Clinical Center of the University of Sarajevo and died there on 25 September 2014, aged 62. Tihić was buried in the cemetery of the White Mosque in his hometown of Bosanski Šamac two days later, on 27 September.

References

External links

The Website of Sulejman Tihić
Town Hall Meeting with Sulejman Tihić, U.S. Institute of Peace, May 2006 (Audio)
Bosnian president 'threatened' by US-based Serbs, Turkishpress.com, 14 August 2006

1951 births
2014 deaths
People from Šamac, Bosnia and Herzegovina
Bosniaks of Bosnia and Herzegovina
Bosnia and Herzegovina Muslims
Sarajevo Law School alumni
Academic staff of the University of Sarajevo
Party of Democratic Action politicians
Politicians of the Bosnian War
Yugoslav Wars prisoners of war
Members of the Presidency of Bosnia and Herzegovina
Chairmen of the Presidency of Bosnia and Herzegovina
Members of the House of Peoples of Bosnia and Herzegovina
Chairmen of the House of Peoples of Bosnia and Herzegovina
Deaths from cancer in Bosnia and Herzegovina